The Testament of Dr. Mabuse is a 1962 German film directed by Werner Klingler. It was the fourth part of the Dr. Mabuse series from the 1960s and was a  remake of the 1933 Fritz Lang film The Testament of Dr. Mabuse.

Cast
Cast adapted from Filmportal.de:

Production
In 1962, producer Artur Brauner set-up a new mini-studio of CCC Film called CCC Filmkunst. This production was set to make three films a year on lower budgets with more freedom to develop a film, which included The Testament of Dr. Mabuse. The Testament of Dr. Mabuse was shot on location in Berlin and at the Spandau Studios between May 16 and May 23, 1962.

Release
The Testament of Dr. Mabuse was distributed theatrically in West Germany by Constantin Film on September 2, 1962. The film was released in 1965 in the United States and was the last of the Dr. Mabuse films to be released theatrically there.

Reception
From contemporary reviews, an anonymous reviewer in the Monthly Film Bulletin reviewed an 88 minute English-dubbed version of the film. The reviewer declared the film "another black mark on the West Germany industry" and "one of the worst of the recent batch of Dr. Mabuse fabrications". He also wrote that despite borrowing elements from Fritz Lang's original film, "lacks even a glimpse of Lang's dramatic flair [...] Things are made worse by an extremely tatty production—somewhat reminiscent of British films of the '30s" and poor quality dubbing.

References

Sources

External links
 

1960s German-language films
Dr. Mabuse films
West German films
Films directed by Werner Klingler
Remakes of German films
German sequel films
Police detective films
Films shot in Berlin
Films shot at Spandau Studios
Constantin Film films
German black-and-white films
1960s German films